Konieczny (masculine), Konieczna (feminine) is a Polish surname. A possible origin is a nickname for a person who lived at the edge of a village, from the archaic meaning of the word konieczny, 'last', 'final'

Early records of the surname are dated by 1425. Its bearers were both szlachta (Polish nobility) and commoners. , there were over 14,000 persons with this surname in Poland.

Notable people with the surname include:

Konieczny 
 Aleksy Konieczny (born 1925), Polish bobsledder
 Bartłomiej Konieczny (born 1981), Polish footballer
 Doug Konieczny (born 1951), American former Major League Baseball pitcher
 Edward J. Konieczny (born 1954),  bishop of the Episcopal Diocese of Oklahoma
 Hans-Peter Konieczny, one of the members of the Red Army Faction
 Janusz Konieczny (senator) (born 1942), Polish politician
 Janusz Konieczny (general) (born 1946), Polish general
 Jerzy Konieczny (born 1950), Polish politician
 Marian Konieczny (1930-2017), Polish sculptor
 Robert Konieczny  (born 1969), Polish architect
 Tomasz Konieczny (born 1972), Polish opera singer
 Zdzisław Konieczny (1930-2016), Polish historian
 Zygmunt Konieczny (born 1937), Polish composer
 Zygmunt Konieczny (bobsleigh) (1927-2003), Polish bobsledder

Konieczna 
 Aleksandra Konieczna, Polish actress
 Aneta Konieczna (born 1978), Polish sprint canoer
 Karolina Konieczna, Polish road cyclist who competed in the 2006 UCI Road World Championships
 Klaudia Konieczna (born 1995), Polish volleyball player

See also
 
 
 Konečný (Czech variant)

References

Polish-language surnames